Hillard Bell Huntington (21 December 1910 in Wilkes Barre, Luzerne County, Pennsylvania – 17 July 1992 Troy, Rensselaer County, New York) was a physicist who (together with Eugene Wigner) first proposed, in 1935, that hydrogen could occur in a metallic state. He is also known for his work on the electromigration of atoms, which later became an important consideration in semiconductor electronics.

Huntington was born in Wilkes Barre, Pennsylvania, and received his bachelor's (1932), master's (1933) and doctoral (1941) degrees from Princeton University. He taught at Culver Military Academy, the University of Pennsylvania and Washington University in St. Louis. During World War II Huntington worked at the Radiation Lab at MIT.

Huntington joined the faculty of Rensselaer Polytechnic Institute in 1946. He served as chair of the physics department at RPI from 1961-1968. He was known as a specialist in diffusion and conduction processes in metals. Ivar Giaever, who won the Nobel Prize in Physics in 1973, was one of his students.  He was an accomplished painter. Some of his paintings are displayed in the Hillard B. Huntington library, named in his honor, located in the Jonsson-Rowland Science center at RPI. RPI established the Hillard B. Huntington Award for graduate students in his honor.

References

1910 births
1992 deaths
20th-century American physicists
Washington University physicists
Princeton University alumni
Rensselaer Polytechnic Institute faculty
University of Pennsylvania faculty
Washington University in St. Louis faculty